Helmsdorf is a village and a former municipality in the district of Eichsfeld in Thuringia, Germany. Since 1 January 2019, it is part of the town Dingelstädt. It is situated on the upper course of the river Unstrut, 12 km northwest of Mühlhausen.

References

Eichsfeld (district)
Former municipalities in Thuringia